Herbert Hardy Cozens-Hardy, 1st Baron Cozens-Hardy,  (1838–1920) was a British politician and judge who served as Master of the Rolls from 1907 until 1918.

Early life and career
Cozens-Hardy was born in Letheringsett, Norfolk in 1838, the second son of William Hardy Cozens-Hardy, a former Norwich solicitor, and Sarah, née Theobald, daughter of Thomas Theobald, textile manufacturer. His grandmother was the diarist Mary Hardy. His family were Methodists, a connection which proved to be useful in his career at the bar.

Cozens-Hardy was educated at Amersham School and University College, London, where he matriculated in 1858 and gained the LLB in 1863, later becoming a fellow of University College. He was called to the bar at Lincoln's Inn in 1862, and read in the chambers of Thomas Lewin and James Dickinson.

Cozens-Hardy acquired a large junior practice at the Chancery bar, and became Queen's Counsel in 1882. It was then the practice of Chancery Queen's Counsels to attach themselves to the court of a particular Chancery Division judge: Cozens-Hardy initially attached himself to the court of Mr Justice Fry; upon the latter's promotion to the Court of Appeal in 1883 he attached himself to Mr Justice North. In 1893 he became a 'special', a Chancery silk unattached to any particular judge, but who charged a special fee of £50 per appearance. Popular among his peers, he was elected chairman of the General Council of the Bar and served until his elevation to the bench 1899.

Political career 
In 1885, Cozens-Hardy was returned as the Liberal Member of Parliament for North Norfolk, keeping the seat until 1899. He frequently spoke on legal matters, although he was never a prominent figure. His most important achievement was the Law of Property Amendment Act 1860 subduing the law of mortmain into only the modern rule against perpetuities. This enabled charities and schools to be set up with less bureaucracy to avoid them being declared void. It is nicknamed the Cozens-Hardy Act. He remained with Gladstone when the Liberal Party split over Irish Home Rule in 1886, although he wavered towards the defectors for a time.

Legal career
In 1899, the elevation of Sir Robert Romer to the Court of Appeal on the death of Lord Justice Chitty created a vacancy in the Chancery Division. Though Lord Halsbury, the Lord Chancellor, was known to biased toward Conservatives in judicial appointments, he nevertheless recommended Cozens-Hardy for the vacancy, writing to him that "Notwithstanding your abominable politics I think you are the fittest person to succeed Romer". Cozens-Hardy was duly appointed to the High Court and assigned to the Chancery Division, receiving the customary knighthood in the 1899 Birthday Honours. In 1901, he succeeded Lord Justice Rigby as a Lord Justice of Appeal and was sworn of the Privy Council.

In 1907 Cozens-Hardy succeeded Sir Richard Henn Collins as Master of the Rolls. He was created Baron Cozens-Hardy, of Letheringsett, in the County of Norfolk, on 1 July 1914. Retiring in 1918, he died less than two years later in 1920, aged 81, and was buried in Kensal Green Cemetery. His eldest son, the Hon William Cozens-Hardy KC MP, succeeded to the barony.

Family 
In 1868, he married Maria Hepburn, who bore him two sons and two daughters before her death in 1886; the spouse's shared tombstone gives to her its sole epigraph: "Love is as strong as death". His town house was 50 Ladbroke Grove, Kensington, London.

Via his elder daughter, Katharine, who married Silvester Horne, he was the maternal grandfather of Kenneth Horne. His younger daughter, Hope, married Austin Pilkington of that glass and crystal making family, and was mother of Harry Pilkington.

Arms

Footnotes and references

Footnote

Citations

External links

 

1838 births
1920 deaths
Barons in the Peerage of the United Kingdom
Burials at Kensal Green Cemetery
20th-century English judges
UK MPs 1885–1886
UK MPs 1886–1892
UK MPs 1892–1895
UK MPs 1895–1900
UK MPs who were granted peerages
People from Letheringsett with Glandford
Chancery Division judges
Liberal Party (UK) MPs for English constituencies
Masters of the Rolls
Members of the Privy Council of the United Kingdom
Knights Bachelor
19th-century King's Counsel
English Methodists
Alumni of University College London
Members of Lincoln's Inn
Barons created by George V